Arthur Campbell Crowder, Sr. (July 16, 1868 - September 15, 1936) was the mayor of Jackson, Mississippi, from 1909 to 1913.

Early life 
Arthur Campbell Crowder was born on July 16, 1868, in Fluvanna County, Virginia, to John Meredith and Mary Boardman (Jones) Crowder. He was one of two sons. While an infant, his family moved to Huntsville, Alabama, where his father worked in the real estate and insurance business and operated a sawmill. His family moved to Birmingham, Alabama, in 1886. Crowder went to private schools. In 1889, he graduated from the Agricultural and Mechanical College at Alabama (now known as Auburn University), where he was affiliated with the Kappa Alpha fraternity. After graduating, he entered the insurance business.

Political career 
In 1898, Crowder moved to Jackson, Mississippi. He also served in many official positions there, including one term as alderman and two terms as president of the Cotton States Baseball League. He also served two terms as mayor of the city, from 1909 to 1913. He was the final mayor of Jackson in the aldermanic form of government. He was a Democrat. He returned to Birmingham in 1916.

Later life 
He became the Mississippi manager for the Prudential Life Insurance Company in 1902. After being promoted to manager of the Alabama and Mississippi section of the Prudential Life Insurance Company, he returned to Birmingham in 1916. He was the president of the Alabama Society of the Sons of the American Revolution from 1923 to 1924. He died in Birmingham, Alabama, on September 15, 1936.

Personal life 
In Jackson, Mississippi, he married Mattie Saunders, the daughter of Robert L. and Annie (Robinson) Saunders, on August 14, 1899. They had one son, Arthur Campbell Crowder, Junior. He was a member of the Masonic Order.

References 

1868 births
1936 deaths
Mayors of Jackson, Mississippi
People from Fluvanna County, Virginia
People from Huntsville, Alabama
People from Jackson, Mississippi
People from Birmingham, Alabama
Mississippi Democrats